"Don't Love Make a Diamond Shine" is a song written by Mike Dekle and Craig Wiseman, and recorded by American country music artist Tracy Byrd. It was released in May 1997 as the third and final single from the album Big Love. The song reached #19 on the Billboard Hot Country Singles & Tracks chart.

Critical reception
Billboard gave the single a positive review, saying that it had a "strong lyric with a sweet sentiment".

Chart performance

References

1997 singles
1996 songs
Tracy Byrd songs
Songs written by Craig Wiseman
Song recordings produced by Tony Brown (record producer)
MCA Records singles